Jennifer Conrad is an American economist currently the Dalton McMichael Distinguished Professor of Finance at Kenan-Flagler Business School. Her current interests are investments and credit default swaps-equity market relationships and high-frequency trading analysis, and previously investment patterns.

References

Year of birth missing (living people)
Living people
University of North Carolina faculty
American economists
American women economists
University of Chicago alumni
Butler University alumni
21st-century American women